Wesley Wyndham Cloete (born 8 February 1990) is a South African rugby union player. His regular position is prop.

Career

Youth

He played in five of their matches in that competition, which saw the team win the Division B final and the promotion play-off which saw them promoted to Division A.

Border Bulldogs

Falcons

Griquas

He then started training with Kimberley-based side  during their 2014 Currie Cup Premier Division campaign.

References

South African rugby union players
Living people
1990 births
Border Bulldogs players
Rugby union props
Rugby union players from East London, Eastern Cape